Gevgelija is a town with a population of 15,685 located in the very southeast of the North Macedonia along the banks of the Vardar River, situated at the country's main border with Greece (Bogorodica-Evzoni), the point which links the motorway from Skopje and three regional capitals, Belgrade, Zagreb, and Sofia with Thessaloniki in Greece. The town is the seat of Gevgelija municipality.

Name
In Macedonian the town is called Gevgelija (Гевгелија). It is known as Gevgeli (Гевгели) in Bulgarian, Gevgeli in Turkish, Đevđelija (Ђевђелија) in Serbian and Yevyelí (Γευγελή) in Greek.

Gevgelija is known as the "Balkan Las Vegas".

History
In the late 19th and early 20th century, Gevgelija was part of the Salonica Vilayet of the Ottoman Empire. According to the statistics of the French geographer Alexandre Synvet, the town had a total Christian population of 290 families (1.740 people) in 1878, consisting of 35 Bulgarian Christian ones and 255 Greek Christian families. The town had also 4 Greek schools. According to Geographers Dimitri Mishev and D. M. Brancoff, in 1905 the town had a population of 4,375 Christians, consisting of 2.240 Patriarchist Bulgarians (Grecomans), 1.840 Exarchist Bulgarians, 80 Serbian Patriarchist Bulgarians (Serbomans), 8 Uniat Bulgarians, 90 Roma people, 72 Vlachs (Megleno-Romanians), 30 Albanians and 15 Greeks.

From 1929 to 1941, Gevgelija was part of the Vardar Banovina of the Kingdom of Yugoslavia.

Transport
The town is served by Gevgelija railway station, located outside the city limits.

Demographics
According to the 2002 census, the town of Gevgelija had 15,685 residents, most of whom were ethnic Macedonians.

Geography

Its position in the south of the country gives it a warm Mediterranean climate (Csa classification), making it the optimal location in North Macedonia for cultivation of fruits and vegetables such as figs, lemons, and grapes. The town is also a centre for raising silkworms, an integral part of the country's silk trade. Alongside its agriculture, Gevgelija's economy consists of a light industry sector. Tourism is growing, with a spa located in a nearby village.

Climate
Gevgelija has a hot-summer mediterranean climate (Köppen climate classification: Csa).

Sports
Local football club FK Kožuf have played in the Macedonian First Football League.

International relations

Twin towns – Sister cities
Gevgelija is twinned with:

Notable people

Gallery

See also 
Vardarski Rid

References

External links

 Gevgelija Photo Essay – Photos of Gevgelija
 Official website of the municipality of Gevgelija – Website with detailed information and history of Gevgelija

Cities in North Macedonia
Greece–North Macedonia border crossings
Gevgelija Municipality